The Alpine Club Guides (commonly shortened to AV Führer or AVF) are the standard series of Alpine guides that cover all the important mountain groups in the Eastern Alps. They are produced jointly by the German (DAV), Austrian (ÖAV) and South Tyrol Alpine Clubs (AVS). They have been published since 1950 by the firm of Bergverlag Rother in Munich, Germany.

The AV guides contain all the routes – hiking trails, mountain hut approaches and summit climbs as well as ice and high mountain routes and klettersteigs in each mountain range. The descriptions are factual and dry, with few illustrations - rather unlike mountain books by e.g. Walter Pause – and despite introductory sections require general Alpine knowledge and experience. Examples are the AVF Allgäuer Alpen and the AVF Verwallgruppe.The AV guides are often used as the basis for other publications and complement the Alpine Club maps  or other map series.

Available guides 
 Allgäuer und Ammergauer Alpen alpin (Dieter Seibert)
 Bayerische Voralpen Ost (Marianne and Emmeram Zebhauser)
 Berchtesgadener Alpen alpin (Bernhard Kühnhauser)
 Bregenzerwald- und Lechquellengebirge alpin (Dieter Seibert)
 Dolomiten: Civettagruppe (Andreas Kubin)
 Dolomiten: Geisler- und Steviagruppe (Ernst Eugen Stiebritz)
 Dolomiten: Pelmo (Richard Goedeke)
 Dolomiten: Puez- und Peitlerkofelgruppe (Ernst Eugen Stiebritz)
 Dolomiten: Sella und Langkofel extrem (Richard Goedeke)
 Dolomiten: Sextener Dolomiten extrem (Richard Goedeke)
 Eisenerzer Alpen (Fritz Peterka)
 Gesäuseberge / Ennstaler Alpen (Willi End)
 Glockner- und Granatspitzgruppe (Willi End)
 Hochkönig (Albert Precht)
 Kaisergebirge alpin (Horst Höfler and Jan Piepenstock)
 Kaisergebirge extrem (Pit Schubert)
 Karawanken (Hans M. Tuschar)
 Karnischer Hauptkamm (Peter Holl)
 Karwendel alpin (Walter Klier)
 Lechtaler Alpen alpin (Dieter Seibert)
 Mieminger Kette (Rudolf Wutscher)
 Niedere Tauern (Peter Holl)
 Ötztaler Alpen (Walter Klier)
 Ortleralpen (Peter Holl)
 Samnaungruppe (Paul Werner and Ludwig Thoma)
 Silvretta alpin (Günter Flaig)
 Stubaier Alpen alpin (Walter Klier)
 Tennengebirge (Albert Precht)
 Totes Gebirge (Gisbert Rabeder)
 Venedigergruppe (Willi End and Hubert Peterka)
 Verwallgruppe (Peter Pindur, Roland Luzian and Andreas Weiskopf)
 Wetterstein (Stefan Beulke)
 Zillertaler Alpen (Walter Klier)

Out-of-print guides 
 Ankogel- and Goldberggruppe (Liselotte Buchenauer und Peter Holl, 1986)
 Brentagruppe (Heinz Steinkötter, 1988)
 Chiemgauer Alpen (Marianne and Helmuth Zebhauser, 1988)
 Dachstein Ost (Willi End, 1980)
 Dachstein West (Willi End, 1980)
 Dolomiten: Cristallogruppe (Jürgen and Angelika Schmidt, 1981)
 Dolomiten: Marmolada (Heinz Mariacher, 1983)
 Dolomiten: Rosengartengruppe (Heinz Mariacher, 1988)
 Dolomiten: Schiaragruppe (Richard Goedeke, 1981)
 Hochschwab (Günter and Luise Auferbauer, 1990)
 Kitzbüheler Alpen (Georg Bleier and Kurt Kettner, 1984)
 Loferer und Leoganger Steinberge (Nikolaus Stockklauser and Adi Stocker, 1991)
 Lienzer Dolomiten (Hubert Peterka and Willi End, 1984)
 Rätikon (Günther Flaig, 1974)
 Rieserfernergruppe (Werner Beikircher, 1983)
 Rofangebirge (Rudolf Röder, Ernst Schmid and Rudger v. Werden, 1983)
 Schobergruppe (Walter Mair, 1979)
 Tannheimer Berge (Marcus Lutz, 1992)

External links 
 German Alpine Club
 Austrian Alpine Club
 South Tyrol Alpine Club
 Bergverlag Rother (publishers), Munich
 Overview of all the Alpine Club Guides
 Swiss Alpine Club

Alps
Alpine clubs
Outdoor recreation organizations
Mountaineering books
Alpine guide books
Books about the Alps